Sholom Dovber Lipskar (born 1946) is a Chabad rabbi who was principal of the Landow Yeshiva in Miami Beach in 1969.  He founded The Shul of Bal Harbour in Surfside, Florida, as well as the Aleph Institute in 1981.

Early life 

Born in Tashkent, Uzbek Soviet Socialist Republic in 1946, Lipskar was smuggled as a baby through the Soviet border to a Displaced person (DP) camp in Germany. On his passport, his country of birth is listed as Germany as this was where he was registered. Arriving in North America in the early 1950s, Lipskar's family settled in Ontario, Canada. Lipskar was ordained as a Rabbi from the Lubavitch Yeshiva in Brooklyn in 1968.

Rabbinical career

Miami Beach 
In 1969, Lipskar was hired as the principal of the Landow Yeshiva School in Miami Beach, Florida. He served as principal of its elementary school for a number of years.

Surfside 

In 1982, Lipskar founded The Shul of Bal Harbour in Surfside, Florida and is its head Rabbi. 

He also founded the Aleph Institute, a non-profit national humanitarian organization dedicated to improving the quality of life for both prisoners and military personnel and their families.

References

External links 
 The Chaim Yakov Shlomo College of Jewish Studies profile
 The Shul Official Web Site

1946 births
American Hasidic rabbis
Chabad-Lubavitch rabbis
Living people
People from Miami Beach, Florida
People from Surfside, Florida